was a village located in Adachi District, Fukushima Prefecture, Japan.

On January 1, 2007, Shirasawa was merged with the former town of Motomiya (also from Adachi District) to create the city of Motomiya.

Demographics
As of 2003, the village had an estimated population of 9,388 as of September 2005 and a density of 191.24 persons per km². The total area was 48.40 km².

Shirasawa had an average of 4.36 members per household, which was the highest in Japan.

History
Shirasawa was founded when the villages of Shiraiwa (白岩村;-mura) and Wagisawa (和木沢村;-mura) merged in April 1955.

Education
Public Schools

(Shirasawa Village School District, now Motomiya City School District)
 Shirasawa Junior High School
 Nukazawa Elementary School
 Wada Elementary School
 Shiraiwa Elementary School

Transportation
 Fukushima Route 28, Motomiya to Miharu
 Fukushima Route 40, Iino to Miharu Ishikawa
 Tohoku Shinkansen tracks run through, though there is no station
 ~5 km to National Route 4
 ~5 km to Tohoku JR East Motomiya Station

External links
 Motomiya official website 

Dissolved municipalities of Fukushima Prefecture
Motomiya, Fukushima